In physical oceanography and fluid mechanics, the Miles-Phillips mechanism describes the generation of wind waves from a flat sea surface by two distinct mechanisms. Wind blowing over the surface generates tiny wavelets. These wavelets develop over time and become ocean surface waves by absorbing the energy transferred from the wind. The Miles-Phillips mechanism is a physical interpretation of these wind-generated surface waves.Both mechanisms are applied to gravity-capillary waves and have in common that waves are generated by a resonance phenomenon. The Miles mechanism is based on the hypothesis that waves arise as an instability of the sea-atmosphere system. The Phillips mechanism assumes that turbulent eddies in the atmospheric boundary layer induce pressure fluctuations at the sea surface. The Phillips mechanism is generally assumed to be important in the first stages of wave growth, whereas the Miles mechanism is important in later stages where the wave growth becomes exponential in time.

History
It was Harold Jeffreys in 1925 who was the first to produce a plausible explanation for the phase shift between the water surface and the atmospheric pressure which can give rise to an energy flux between the air and the water. For the waves to grow, a higher pressure on the windward side of the wave, in comparison to the leeward side, is necessary to create a positive energy flux. Using dimensional analysis, Jeffreys showed that the atmospheric pressure can be displayed as 

The subscript  is used to make the distinction that no boundary layer is considered in this theory.
Expanding this pressure term to the energy transfer yields

With this theory, Jeffreys calculated the sheltering coefficient at a value of 0.3 based on observations of wind speeds.  In 1956, Fritz Ursell examined available data on pressure variation in wind tunnels from multiple sources and concluded that the value of  found by Jeffreys was too large. This result led Ursell to reject the theory from Jeffreys.  Ursell's work also resulted in new advances in the search for a plausible mechanism for wind-generated waves. These advances led a year later to two new theoretical concepts: the Miles and Phillips mechanisms.

Miles' Theory
John W. Miles developed his theory in 1957 for inviscid, incompressible air and water. He assumed that air can be expressed as a mean shear flow with varying height above the surface. 
By solving the hydrodynamic equations for the coupled sea-atmosphere system, Miles was able to express the free surface elevation as a function of wave parameters and sea-atmosphere characteristics as

The wind speed as a function of height was found by integrating the Orr-Sommerfeld equation with the assumption of a logarithmic boundary layer and that in the equilibrium state no currents below the sea surface exist

Furthermore, Miles defined the growth rate  of the wave energy for arbitrary angles  between the wind and the waves as

Miles determined  in his 1957 paper by solving the inviscid form of the Orr-Sommerfeld equation.
 
with  the frequency of the wave and  the amplitude of the vertical velocity field at the critical height . The first derivative  describes the shear of the wind velocity field and the second derivative  described the curvature of the wind velocity field. 
This result represents Miles' classical result for the growth of surface waves. It becomes clear that without wind shear in the atmosphere, the result from Miles fails, hence the name 'shear instability mechanism'. 

Even though this theory gives an accurate description of the transfer of energy from the wind to the waves, it also has some limitations

 Miles considered the case of inviscid air and water, which means that viscous effects are neglected in this case.
 The effects that waves have on the atmospheric boundary layer are not taken into account.
 Only the case of linear effects are examined with this theory.
 Miles theory predicts growth of waves for all wind speeds, observations show however that there exists a minimum wind speed of 0.23 m/s before growth occurs.

Snyder and Cox (1967) were the first to produce a relationship for the experimental growth rate due to atmospheric forcing by use of experimental data. They found

where  the wind speed measured at a height of 10 meters and  a spectrum of the form of the JONSWAP. The JONSWAP spectrum is a spectrum based on data collected during the Joint North Sea Wave Observation Project and is a variation on the Pierson-Moskowitz spectrum, but then multiplied by an extra peak enhancement factor

Phillips' Theory
At the same time, but independently from Miles, Owen M. Phillips (1957) developed his theory for the generation of waves based on the resonance between a fluctuating pressure field and surface waves. The main idea behind Phillips' theory is that this resonance mechanism causes the waves to grow when the length of the waves matches the length of the atmospheric pressure fluctuations. This means that the energy will be transferred to the components in the spectrum which satisfy the resonance condition. 
Phillips determined the atmospheric source term for his theory as the following

where  is the frequency spectrum, with the three dimensional wave number . 
The strong points from this theory are that waves can grow from an initially smooth surface, so the initial presence of surface waves is not necessary. In addition, contrary to Miles' theory, this theory does predict that no wave growth can occur if the wind speed is below a certain value. 
Miles theory predicts exponential growth of waves with time, while Phillips theory predicts linear growth with time. The linear growth of the wave is especially observed in the earliest stages of wave growth. For later stages, Miles' exponential growth is more consistent with observations.

See also 
 Gravity waves
 Wind waves
 Wind stress
 Swell

References 

physical oceanography